Eleonore Schikaneder (1751–1821) was an Austrian stage actress and theatre manager.   She was the daughter of the theater manager Franz Josef Moser (1717–1792) and married in 1777–85 to the actor Emanuel Schikaneder.  She was engaged at the company of Andreas Joseph Schopf in 1776–85, and at the Theater auf der Wieden in 1788. She managed her own company in 1785–88, managed the Freihaustheater in Vienna from 1788.

In 2016, the musical Schikaneder by Stephen Schwartz and Christian Stuppeck and directed by Trevor Nunn, based on the premise that Die Zauberflöte sprang from Eleonore's tumultuous relationship with Schikaneder, debuted at the Raimund Theater.

References

1751 births
1821 deaths
18th-century Austrian actresses
Austrian stage actresses
Austrian theatre directors
18th-century theatre managers
18th-century businesswomen
18th-century Austrian businesspeople